Psilogramma japonica is a moth of the  family Sphingidae. It is found in Japan.

References

Psilogramma
Moths described in 2001
Endemic fauna of Japan